Robert Stewart may refer to:

Nobility and politics
 Robert II of Scotland (1316–1390), King of Scots
 Robert III of Scotland (c. 1340–1406), King of Scots, son of the above
 Robert Stewart, 4th Lord of Aubigny (c. 1470–1544), French soldier
 Robert Stewart, 1st Earl of March (c. 1522–1586), 1st Earl of March, Scottish nobleman
 Robert Stewart, 1st Earl of Orkney (1533–1593), illegitimate son of James V, King of Scotland
 Sir Robert Stewart (d. c.1670), Scottish soldier, Governor of Londonderry
 Robert Stewart, 1st Marquess of Londonderry (1739–1821), Irish politician and landowner
 Robert Stewart, Duke of Albany (c. 1340–1420), Scottish royal, regent to three Scottish monarchs
 Robert Stewart, Master of Atholl (died 1437), Scottish nobleman of royal descent, great-grandson of Robert II
 Robert Stewart, Viscount Castlereagh (1769–1822), Irish politician 
 Robert Stewart (Australian politician) (1831–1908), member of the Queensland Legislative Assembly
 Robert Stewart (Canadian politician) (1850–1925)
 Robert Stewart (New South Wales politician) (1816–1875), New South Wales colonial politician
 Robert Stewart (Prince Edward Island politician) (1731–1787), first Speaker of the Legislative Assembly of Prince Edward Island
 Robert Desmond Stewart (born 1949), Northern Irish politician
 Robert Marcellus Stewart (1815–1871), governor of Missouri
 Robert Strother Stewart (1878–1954), English lawyer, colonial judge and Liberal Party politician
 Robert Stewart (Alabama politician), American Democratic politician running in the 2022 Alabama Senate election primary

Sports
 Robert Stewart (lineman) (1967-2022), arena football player
 Robert Stewart (American football coach), American football coach for Washburn University
 Robert Stewart (cricketer) (1856–1913), South African batsman
 Robert Stewart (draughts player) (1873–1941), British champion of English draughts from Scotland
 Robert Stewart (footballer, born 1894), Scottish footballer with Motherwell and Ayr United
 Robert Stewart (Morton footballer) ( 1900s), Scottish footballer with Morton
 Robert Stewart (sailor) (1906–1988), New Zealand yachtsman

Business
 Robert Stewart (designer), Scottish designer
 Robert Stewart (entrepreneur) (1918–2006), American entrepreneur and founder of GMA Network
 Robert Stewart (industrialist) (1913–2007), New Zealand industrialist knighted in 1979

Other
 Robert Banks Stewart (1931–2016), Scottish-born television writer, sometimes credited as Robert Stewart
 Sir Robert Christie Stewart (1926–2019), Scottish army officer, landowner, and Lord Lieutenant
 Robert John Stewart (born 1949), author and occultist
 Robert L. Stewart (born 1942), astronaut
 Robert Leslie Stewart (1918–1988), executioner
 Robert Prescott Stewart (1825–1894), Irish composer, organist and conductor
 Robert Stewart (priest) (1850–1895), Anglican Church missionary to China
 Robert Stewart (born 1963), perpetrator of the Carthage nursing home shooting
 Robert Stewart (born 1980), perpetrator of the murder of Zahid Mubarek
 Robert Stewart (saxophonist) (born 1969), American musician
 Robert Stewart, of Irry (1598–1662), Irish rebel
 Robert Walter Stewart (1812–1887), Scottish minister of the Free Church of Scotland

See also
 Rab Stewart (1932–1992), Scottish footballer from the 1950s and 1960s
 Rab Stewart (footballer, born 1962) (1962–2016), Scottish footballer from the 1980s
 Bob Stewart (disambiguation)
 Robert Stuart (disambiguation)
 Robert Steward (disambiguation)
 Rob Stewart (disambiguation)